The Rotonda de los Jaliscienses Ilustres (formerly the Rotonda de los Hombres Ilustres) is a landmark in Centro, Guadalajara, in the Mexican state of Jalisco.

Description and history
Located at the flanked avenues of Fray Antonio Alcalde, Miguel Hidalgo and the streets Liceo and Independencia, it honors the memory of the people of Jalisco that has transcended through history. The architect was Vicente Mendiola, who selected a neoclassical style. The rotunda has 17 columns and is made of quarry.

Statues

 Statue of Agustín de la Rosa
 Statue of Agustín Yáñez
 Statue of Clemente Aguirre
 Statue of Antonio Alcalde Barriga
 Statue of Dr. Atl
 Statue of Efraín González Luna
 Statue of Enrique Díaz de León
 Statue of Enrique González Martínez
 Statue of Francisco Rojas González
 Statue of Francisco Silva Romero
 Statue of Gabriel Flores
 Statue of Heliodoro Hernández Loza
 Statue of Ignacio Vallarta
 Statue of Irene Robledo
 Statue of Jacobo Gálvez
 Statue of Jorge Matute Remus
 Statue of José Clemente Orozco
 Statue of José Guadalupe Zuno
 Statue of Juan José Arreola
 Statue of Leonardo Oliva
 Statue of Luis Barragán
 Statue of Luis Pérez Verdía
 Statue of Manuel López Cotilla
 Statue of Manuel M. Diéguez
 Statue of Marcelino García Barragán
 Statue of María Izquierdo
 Statue of Mariano Otero
 Statue of Pedro Moreno
 Statue of Rafael Preciado Hernández
 Statue of Rita Pérez de Moreno
 Statue of Valentín Gómez Farías

References

External links

 

Buildings and structures in Guadalajara, Jalisco
Rotonda de los Jaliscienses Ilustres
Tourist attractions in Guadalajara, Jalisco